William Jack Henry Bentinck, Viscount Woodstock, Graf Bentinck (born 19 May 1984), commonly known as Will Bentinck, is a English Chicago-based social entrepreneur and speaker.

Background and education
Bentinck is the elder son of English actor Timothy Bentinck, 12th Earl of Portland, and couture milliner Judith ("Judy") Ann Emerson, daughter of John Robert Emerson, of 70, Queen Street, Cheadle, Staffordshire. When his father inherited the earldom, Bentinck became Viscount Woodstock, having previously held the courtesy title of Lord Cirencester. Born in London, he attended Harrow School and  Heythrop College, University of London graduating with first-class honours in philosophy in 2010.

Career
After having gained his degree, Bentinck co-founded The Ragged University, a free service offering peer-to-peer educational events inspired by the 19th century English ragged schools. In December of the same year, Bentinck co-founded Levantine Links, a nonprofit organisation recruiting high-calibre UK graduates to provide English language programmes serving children and adults in Al-Hasakah, Syria, in collaboration with the Syriac Orthodox Church.

In March 2012, he was named a Vodafone Foundation 'World of Difference' winner, receiving funding for an internship with Ashoka, a fellowship of some of the world's leading social entrepreneurs.

In 2012, Bentinck joined Enternships, founded by award-winning young entrepreneur Rajeeb Dey. He spoke at TEDxSquareMile, is a course leader for the Accelerator Academy and is a Tech London Advocate as Head of Careers at Makers Academy.

Personal life
On 1 July 2021, at Crear, Argyll and Bute, Scotland, Bentinck married Rebecca, daughter of Christopher Newton, of Saintfield, County Down, Northern Ireland.

References

External links
Bentinck's travel blog, "Questing for a New Mojo" at 
'Generation Y Gets Help to Produce Brilliant Entrepreneurs' Spears' WMS

1984 births
Living people
British people of Dutch descent
English people of Dutch descent
People educated at Harrow School
Alumni of Heythrop College
Alumni of the University of Kent
William Bentinck, Viscount Woodstock
Woodstock
Counts of the Holy Roman Empire
Teutonic Knights